The Genga River is a river on Bougainville Island, located within the Autonomous Region of Bougainville, in northeastern Papua New Guinea.

The river flows into the Solomon Sea on the western side of Bougainville Island.

Rivers of Papua New Guinea
Geography of the Autonomous Region of Bougainville